The Texas Seed Bill was a 1887 United States federal law to deliver $10,000 of aid to purchase seed grain for farmers after a horrendous drought in Texas.  The law was vetoed by President Grover Cleveland. In his veto message, Cleveland argued:

References

1887 in American law
1887 in Texas
United States proposed federal legislation
Veto
Grover Cleveland